Ivan Ivanov (24 April 1937 – 27 August 2010) was a Bulgarian wrestler. He competed in the men's Greco-Roman lightweight at the 1964 Summer Olympics.

References

External links
 

1937 births
2010 deaths
Bulgarian male sport wrestlers
Olympic wrestlers of Bulgaria
Wrestlers at the 1964 Summer Olympics
Place of birth missing